Daniel Albert Halldorson (April 2, 1952 – November 18, 2015) was a Canadian professional golfer who played on the PGA Tour and the Canadian Tour.

Halldorson was born in Winnipeg, Manitoba, and raised in Brandon, Manitoba. He did not attend college and turned pro in 1971. He joined the Canadian Tour in 1973 and the PGA Tour in 1975.

Halldorson had seven career wins on the Canadian Tour and its predecessors. He won one official PGA Tour event, the 1980 Pensacola Open, and finished a career best 36th on the PGA Tour money list that year. He won the unofficial Deposit Guaranty Golf Classic in 1986. Halldorson was a member of seven WGC-World Cup Canadian national teams (1976, 1978, 1979, 1980, 1982, 1985, 1991) including two winning teams (1980, 1985).

Halldorson played briefly on the Champions Tour after turning 50 in 2002.

Halldorson was the deputy director of the Canadian Tour and named a Lifetime Member in 2005. He was elected to the Canadian Golf Hall of Fame in 2002, and the Manitoba Sports Hall of Fame in 2007. He operated a golf course design business with fellow former PGA Tour golfer Mike Morley. Halldorson also authored a golf instructional book. He lived in Cambridge, Illinois.

Halldorson died from a massive stroke at the age of 63.

Professional wins (13)

PGA Tour wins (1)

PGA Tour playoff record (0–1)

Canadian Tour wins (7)

Other wins (5)

Results in major championships

Note: Halldorson never played in The Open Championship.

CUT = missed the half-way cut
WD = withdrew
"T" = tied

Results in The Players Championship

CUT = missed the halfway cut
"T" indicates a tie for a place

Team appearances
World Cup (representing Canada): 1976, 1978, 1979, 1980 (winners), 1982, 1985 (winners), 1991
Dunhill Cup (representing Canada): 1985, 1986, 1987, 1988, 1989, 1991

See also
1974 PGA Tour Qualifying School graduates
Fall 1978 PGA Tour Qualifying School graduates
1990 PGA Tour Qualifying School graduates

References

External links
Dan Halldorson (archived copy)

Profile at Canadian Golf Hall of Fame

Canadian male golfers
PGA Tour golfers
PGA Tour Champions golfers
Golf course architects
Golfing people from Manitoba
Canadian people of Icelandic descent
Sportspeople from Winnipeg
Sportspeople from Brandon, Manitoba
People from Cambridge, Illinois
1952 births
2015 deaths